Alastorynerus ludendorffi is a species of wasp in the family Vespidae.

The species was named in 1917 after the German General Erich Ludendorff, First Quartermaster-general of the Imperial Army's Great General Staff in the previous year, a chief policymaker in a de facto military dictatorship that dominated Germany for the rest of the First World War.

References

Potter wasps